Mesoleiini is a tribe of parasitic wasps in the subfamily Ctenopelmatinae.

Genera  
 Alcochera
 Alexeter
 Anoncus 
 Apholium
 Arbelus
 Atithasus
 Azelus
 Barytarbes
 Campodorus
 Dentimachus
 Himerta
 Hyperbatus
 Iskarus
 Lagarotis
 Lamachus
 Leipula
 Mesoleius
 Neostroblia
 Otlophorus
 Perispuda
 Protarchus
 Rhinotorus
 Saotis
 Scopesis
 Semimesoleius
 Smicrolius

References 

 Kasparian, D.R. & J.-P. Kopelke 2010: A taxonomic review of ichneumon-flies (Hymenoptera, Ichneumonidae), parasitoids of gall-forming sawflies (Hymenoptera, Tenthredinidae) on Salix. Part II. Review of the Palaearctic species of the genus Saotis Förster with description of four new species. Entomological Review 90 (1), pages 71–98,

External links 
 
 

Ichneumonidae
Parasitica tribes